Dębno  is a village in the administrative district of Gmina Nowy Targ, within Nowy Targ County, Lesser Poland Voivodeship, in southern Poland.

The village has a population of 800.

Its main tourist attraction is the St. Michael the Archangel Church from 15th century, part of the UNESCO monument, the Wooden churches of Southern Lesser Poland.

References

Villages in Nowy Targ County